George Winn (born November 10, 1990) is a former American football running back. He played college football at Cincinnati. He originally signed with the Houston Texans as an undrafted free agent in 2013. He has also been a member of the New England Patriots, Oakland Raiders, Pittsburgh Steelers, Dallas Cowboys, Detroit Lions, New York Giants and Indianapolis Colts.

Professional career

Houston Texans
On April 28, 2013, Winn signed with the Houston Texans as an undrafted free agent.

New England Patriots
On June 17, 2013, he signed with the New England Patriots.

Oakland Raiders
On October 2, 2013, he signed with the Oakland Raiders as a member of the practice squad. The Raiders released Winn from the practice squad on October 15, 2013.

Pittsburgh Steelers
The Steelers signed Winn to their practice squad on October 22, 2013. He was released on November 19, 2013 and replaced by rookie Ray Graham, another undrafted free agent initially signed by the Houston Texans.

Dallas Cowboys
On December 4, 2013, Winn signed with the Dallas Cowboys practice squad. The Cowboys waived Winn on December 17, 2013.

Detroit Lions
During the 2014 offseason, Winn tried out for the Atlanta Falcons, but was not signed. Afterwards, the Detroit Lions signed him on July 16, 2014. He played twelve games for the Lions in 2014, gaining 73 yards on 19 carries. He was placed on the Lions' practice squad at the start of the 2015 season, but moved to the main club on October 19 after an injury to Zach Zenner.

On September 3, 2016, Winn was waived by the Lions and was signed to the practice squad the next day.
On September 9, 2016, he was released from the Lions practice squad, but was re-signed on September 21, 2016. He released was on October 3, 2016.

New York Giants
On October 31, 2016, Winn was signed to the New York Giants' practice squad, but was released on December 14, 2016. He was re-signed to their active roster on December 20, 2016. He was waived by the Giants on May 1, 2017.

Indianapolis Colts
On August 9, 2017, Winn signed with the Indianapolis Colts. He was placed on injured reserve on August 29, 2017. He was waived by the Colts on April 24, 2018.

Personal life
Winn is the cousin of former NFL wide receiver Derrick Mason . His first cousin, L. Webber, is the sister-in-law of former NBA player Chris Webber.

References

External links
Cincinnati Bearcats football bio
New England Patriots bio

1990 births
Living people
Sportspeople from Southfield, Michigan
Players of American football from Michigan
American football running backs
University of Detroit Jesuit High School and Academy alumni
Cincinnati Bearcats football players
Houston Texans players
New England Patriots players
Oakland Raiders players
Pittsburgh Steelers players
Dallas Cowboys players
Detroit Lions players
New York Giants players
Indianapolis Colts players